Michael Hádek (born 8 May 1990) is a Czech motorcycle speedway rider who is a member of the Czech junior national team.

Speedway career details

World championships 

 Individual U-21 World Championship
 2008 – 9th place in the qualifying round 5
 2009 – 13th place in the qualifying round 1
 2010 – 9th place in the qualifying round 1
 Team U-21 World Championship (U-21 Speedway World Cup)
 2008 – 2nd place in the qualifying round 1
 2009 –  Gorzów Wlkp. – did not start in the final (in qualifying round only)
 2010 – 3rd place in the qualifying round One

European championships 

 Individual European Championship
 2008 – 15th place in the semi-final 3
 Individual U-19 European Championship
 2008 –  Stralsund – 12th place (5 pts)
 2009 –  Tarnów – 11th place (5 pts)
 Team U-19 European Championship
 2008 – 4th place in the semi-final 2
 2009 –  Holsted – 4th place (9 pts)

Domestic competitions 

 Team Polish Championship (League)
 2007 – 7th place in Second League for Prague (average 1.389)
 2008 – 6th place in Second League for Krosno (average 1.050)
 2009 – for Krosno
 Team Czech Championship (Extraliga)
 2007 – Czech Champion

World Longtrack Championship

Grand-Prix
 2010 1 app (28th) 2pts

See also 
 Czech Republic national speedway team

References

External links
 Hádek's website (in Czech, just a single page with biographical details)

Czech speedway riders
1990 births
Living people
Individual Speedway Long Track World Championship riders